Grand Dakar Arrondissement  is an arrondissement of the Dakar Department in the Dakar Region of Senegal.

It is divided into 6 communes d'arrondissement: Biscuiterie, Dieuppeul-Derklé, Grand Dakar, Hann Bel-Air, H.L.M. and Sicap-Liberté.

References

Arrondissements of Senegal
Dakar Region